Bengt Sören Berg (born 1946) is a Swedish poet, politician and former member of the Riksdag, the national legislature. A member of the Left Party, he represented Värmland County between October 2010 and September 2014.

References

1946 births
Living people
Members of the Riksdag 2010–2014
Members of the Riksdag from the Left Party (Sweden)
Swedish male poets